GHG may stand for:

 Marshfield Municipal Airport (Massachusetts), US, FAA code
 General Healthcare Group, UK
 George H. Goble, computer engineer
 Greenhouse gas
 Gruppenhorchgerät, a German sonar
Gram, Hambro & Garman a Norwegian law firm